Denis Norman Zanoni (2 April 1941 – 11 May 1991) was an Australian rules footballer who played with Geelong in the Victorian Football League (VFL).

References

 Holmesby, Russell & Main, Jim (2007). The Encyclopedia of AFL Footballers. 7th ed. Melbourne: Bas Publishing.

External links

1941 births
Australian rules footballers from Victoria (Australia)
Geelong Football Club players
1991 deaths
Place of birth missing